Jean Carlos Caicedo Pachito (born 10 January 1995) is an Ecuadorian boxer. He competed in the men's featherweight event at the 2020 Summer Olympics.

References

External links
 

1995 births
Living people
Ecuadorian male boxers
Olympic boxers of Ecuador
Boxers at the 2020 Summer Olympics
Pan American Games competitors for Ecuador
Boxers at the 2019 Pan American Games
People from Manabí Province
21st-century Ecuadorian people